The Haft Gumbaz, also spelt Haft Gumbad are a group of tombs of the Bahmani dynasty situated in Kalaburagi, in the Indian state of Karnataka.
Built during the 14th and 15th centuries, the tombs are examples of early Indo-Islamic architecture. There are seven tombs in total, with four being tombs of the rulers of the Bahmani dynasty. The tomb complex is a monument of national importance, maintained by the Archeological Survey of India.
The tomb complex is part of the "Monuments and Forts of the Deccan Sultanate", which is an ensemble of various structures added to the tentative list of the UNESCO World Heritage Sites.

History 
The tomb complex was built between the 14th and 15th centuries. The capital shifted to Bidar in 1425, and the later Bahmani sultans are buried in the Bahmani tombs complex in Bidar.
The tomb complex has been encroached by local businesses and institutions. A social activist, K.M. Mujeebuddin, has filed an RTI query regarding the upkeep of the tombs.

Architecture 

The architectural style is reminiscent of Tughlaq architecture. A unique feature seen only in the Haft Gumbaz is the double-chambered tomb, with one chamber for the king and the other for his family members.

There are seven tombs in total, with four being Sultan's tombs. The tombs are situated in a garden.

Tomb of Mujahid Shah 
This was the first tomb to be built. It is a single-chambered square tomb, free of any elaborate embellishments. It is located on a low base. It is on the West end of the tomb complex.

Tomb of Daud Shah 
It is a double-chambered tomb.

Tomb of Shams al-Din and Ghiyath al-Din 
The two tombs share the same basement.

Tomb of Firuz Shah Bahmani 
The tomb of Firuz Shah Bahmani is the largest, and is considered the most important of the complex. It is also a double-chambered tomb. The external and internal elevation is divided into two tiers, adorned by double-recessed arches. The arches of the upper tier have jali-style decorations.

References 

Tombs in Karnataka
Bahmani architecture